The Kebir-Jami Mosque is located in Simferopol, Crimea. Kebir-Jami mosque is a prominent architectural monument in Simferopol and the oldest building in the city.

History
In 1508, or 914 Hijri by the Muslim calendar, Kebir-Jami mosque was dedicated. Writing at the entrance of the mosque in Arabic states: "This mosque was built for the Glory of the Mightiness of the Khan Meñli I Giray, may Allah forgive all sins of himself and his children in the month of Muharram in the year of nine hundred and fourteen".  It is believed that the white walls of the mosque gave name to the medieval city of Aqmescit (White Mosque). Through the years the mosque has undergone reconstruction many times.

After World War II Kebir-Jami was left in a state of neglect. For several years the mosque was used as a book-cover workshop. After the return of the Crimean Tatars from deportation a revival of the old mosque began: in 1989 the mosque was given back to the Muslim community. Reconstruction began in late October 1991.

Today, Kebir-Jami is the main Friday mosque of Crimea, it is the residence of the Mufti and the location of the Spiritual Direction of the Muslims of Crimea. The grounds also included a madrasah (educational institution) and the Crimean Tatar library.

See also
Religion in Crimea
List of mosques in Russia
List of mosques in Europe

References 

Mosques in Crimea
Buildings and structures in Simferopol
16th-century mosques
Religious buildings and structures completed in 1508
Closed mosques in the Soviet Union
Cultural heritage monuments of regional significance in Crimea